

IDare's for Sustainable Development (IDare)

Theory of Change

Strengthening resilience 
IDare believes in youth as the driving force towards development as a comprehensive sustainable concept where social, economic and political dimensions are equally respected. We believe in the transformative power of positive behavior change led by youth. We are committed to supporting the creation of peaceful societies built upon actively engaged individuals taking control of their own lives and building solutions leading to sustainable development.

In the current context of growing apathy, social conflicts, and violence, we need more engaged and active conscious citizens to counter these trends. There is a substantial gap between the current level of engagement that exists in the world and the level of engagement IDare is trying to generate. However, since young people have historically shown that they have the potential to be active and inspiring models for society, to generate innovative ideas and to lead positive change for themselves and others, we believe they are best placed to lead this movement.

Our vision of change rests on the belief that youth are able to determine the critical issues, causes, and pathways necessary to generate positive behavior change in their societies. They can spearhead the process of change and can lead to real results for others affected by their changes.

Link

Enabling youth agency 
Building on several years of engagement with youth in Jordan, IDARE has identified three essential components that enhance the capacity of youth to use their agency to lead social change: when they have increased abilities and strengthened competencies that allow them to act on change, when they have increased access to resources and tools that allow them to determine and lead change and when their operating environment is receptive to their proposed changes.

Although the first component related to youth increasing their abilities and competencies is central in developing their agency, the three components can be worked on separately if needed. However, optimal change can be achieved if each component is addressed in connection to one other. Furthermore, youth will have ownership over which component would work best in accordance to their needs and priorities.

 Investment in youth’s abilities and competencies.
 Access to tools and spaces for youth to apply their agency.
 Enabling environment for youth to exercise their agency.

1. Investment in youth’s abilities and competencies 
IDare operates with a model of developing self-awareness, inner readiness, enhancing knowledge, developing skills and changing attitudes through a process of lifelong learning. Individuals can, therefore, become empowered to select issues, changes, and mechanisms that they identify as being the most suitable for the positive changes that matter most to them. All work on abilities has an additional focus on incorporating technical capacity building, such as structured dialogue, violent extremism, and countering hate speech. IDare also provides training, workshops and one on one coaching to better develop their abilities and competencies for them to lead changes.

2. Access to tools and spaces for youth to apply their agency 
IDare supports youth through improving their access to tools and resources. These tools and resources can offer youth safe spaces to explore their ideas, or platforms to magnify their reach. This combination of platforms, safe spaces, access to funding and networking opportunities allows for youth to achieve their potential in a flexible environment. Some examples of these tools and resources are; daring hub, e-spaces & knowledge hub, makers space, creation hub, building national & regional coalitions, funding, and networking.

3. Enabling environment for youth to exercise their agency 
Through a power and context analysis, IDare identified that policy influencing and advocacy work could help improve the enabling environment for youth. Policy and advocacy work can be an effective tool at countering harmful and counter-productive perceptions of youth in society and by legal, political, social and economic institutions. Policy influencing strategies can be especially effective at creating a legal-political framework that can protect youth seeking to promote positive change.

Human-centered design 
IDare pays close attention to the right holders we work with and therefore having a human-centered design is a crucial step towards ensuring that we are starting from having a proper understanding of the right holders we work with, we are able to grasp their needs and with using creative approaches towards addressing those needs and providing innovative solutions that would speak to them.

IDare’s competency model for strengthening societal resilience 
IDare team together with the youth, we invested in the whole of 2018 using a human-centered design process towards identifying IDare’s 15 competency model that would make a young person more resilient. IDare competency model is integrated into our programs where youth will have the chance to work on developing or acquiring one or more of these competencies through approaching three dimensions: knowledge, skills, and attitudes for each competency.

Emotional intelligence and wellbeing 
IDare focuses heavily on the emotional understanding and wellbeing of individuals. IDare believes that dialogue, mutual respect, and social cohesion and peacebuilding starts from having a prosperous status of emotional intelligence and wellbeing.

Building the capacities of people, we work with around understanding feelings and emotions and how they are influencing our decisions and taking part even in shaping our life and future. It is important to have the time to start working on our intelligence from the emotional side and to increase our vocabulary we are using while realising that we can move from one spectrum to the opposite one in order to boost our wellbeing and state of mind.

Having a profound understanding of who we are, why and how we are behaving the way we do, makes us more understanding and even more empathetic to the ones around us. All of this would lead to the overall wellbeing of the whole society and most importantly, everyone will start from their own small network among families and friends.

Kanabay 
15 episodes on YouTube, link talking about emotional intelligence development.

C-Hub: Innovation in Creation concept 
The aim of the C-Hub project is to make the youth (18 - 30 years old) more employable through Creative Entrepreneurship in Jordan. IDare has been working into strengthening the capacity of youth in Jordan, building community, and creating conversation around Creative and Cultural Industries in Jordan. We started with an innovation process to build the concept of the C-Hub “The Creative Hub” to enable capacity building, knowledge sharing, and networking to occur within the Creative and Cultural Industries in Jordan. 

Through the C-Hub: Innovation in Creation we have been running programs supporting the young women and men in Jordan to be part of the Creative and Cultural Industries since 2018. So far, we managed to work directly with 650 people through onsite capacity building and blended learning approach during the Covid pandemia and 1206 indirectly through the 21 Meetups, Open Days and two forums about Creative and Cultural Industries in Jordan. The aim of the annual forum is to bring together youth-makers, suppliers, and relevant stakeholders. The value of the forum is to create national dialogue around Creative and Cultural Industries in Jordan and to try to understand what is there, where we are and what is missing. 

Makathones also have been part of the C-Hub activities that were incorporated for the last two years where 26 people participated. In addition to taking part in different bazaars happening in Amman such as Jara Market, Christmas Bazaar and Hands Bazaar. The aim of joining the Bazaars is to give the participants real life experience in producing products and selling them directly to customers. Such hands-on experience is crucial to understanding the customer, the market, pricing, negotiation, what works and what does not work. 

The capacity building conducted at the C-Hub is on site and later on we created a DIY video -Do It Yourself- tutorial that is available on our Amman DIY YouTube channel www.youtube.com/c/ammandiy. The aim of the channel is to support the makers community with Arabic DIY content about basics of making certain items. The learning journey is supported with technical aspects related to making products and to understanding basics of social entrepreneurship where the value proposition comes in. In addition to the practical part of the capacity building where the youth spend some time at the C-Hub to make certain products under technical supervision from the C-Hub coaches. Raw materials are always offered to ensure that makers-youth have everything they need in order to create and make.

C-Hub: She Rises… We Rise 
The C-Hub is partnering with Google Organization for running a 3 years (September 2022 until July 2023) funded project aimed for women and girls in Jordan 18 - 35 years old from the central region of Jordan.  Through its recently funded project C-Hub: She Rises… We Rise, IDare for Sustainable Development is providing a safe hub for women to gain technical skills in the creative industry. 

IDare for Sustainable De velopment - non profit applied for Google Impact Challenge for Women and Girls in March 2021. Out of 8000 applications in this global competition, IDare was among 34 organizations who got awarded by Google Organization. We are proud that IDare is the only and first organization from Jordan and WANA region to enter and win such a prestigious and global competition.  

Through “The Creative Hub (The C-Hub),   200 young women will develop skills in design thinking, product making, and machinery handling within creative industries, including sectors that are traditionally male-dominated (e.g., carpentry). The C-Hub is one of the only central and safe community centers for women in Jordan.

Main activities: 9 components 
Women and girls who will be joining C-Hub: She Rises… We Rise project will be part of a rich learning experience within the C-Hub ecosystem supported with coaching and hands-on experience. 

 Social entrepreneurship on line course in Arabic: based on our previous experience with the C-Hub project and needs cited by the participant, we developed a 5 moule online course in Arabic hosted on Udemy. The video classes are of around 6 hours duration. They take the learner into a full learning experience from the phase of dream into growing their business idea or startup. They will be ready to grow on their own after they complete the C-Hub project.
 Design thinking mainstreamed: we realized the importance of mainstreaming design thinking as this is a prerequisite towards having a product that is covering a need in the market which comes with having the empathy being already created.
 DIY video tutorial for making-basics: the YouTube channel is to support makers who are speaking in Arabic in basics of carpentry, wood, resin and other topics. More DIY topics will be identified in order to create content for. The DIY video tutorial is to support our on-site capacity building where the participants join the C-Hub to apply what they have learned into making certain items.
 Capacity building: onsite capacity building that is covering both theoretical and making aspects. Capacity building is covering; 2D and 3D design, CNC laser and router operation, 3D printing, carpentry and woodwork, and DIY startup kits where the participants get to keep part of the raw material at home to try and produce more prototypes for their experimentation and further idea development.
 Makathones: it is a supported 2 weeks learning and making experience to work on tailoring the idea prototype at a tested level that is ready for investment. This is another strength at the C-Hub when it comes to idea development and having a solid prototype that is tested and ready to move to the next phase.
 Internships: 18 participants will be hosted in a paid internship for 6 months duration which will provide them with a direct on the job training at a makerspace that represent future jobs as well.
 Bazaars: each year we will be taking part in key bazaars in Amman in order to provide for the participants hands-on experience related to selling and dealing directly with potential customers.
 Creative and Cultural Industries Forum: so fa r we did 2 forums and the aim is to have the Creative and Cultural Industries forum on yearly basis. The aim of the forum is to bring makers’ community and relevant stakeholders together, to exchange knowledge related to creative and cultural industries in Jordan, and to have a platform for an annual meetup for those who are engaged in the sector.
 Coaching: Any ecosystem can not be complete without having coaching and personnel who are supporting an intensive and long learning journey. The whole life of the project is supported by technical teams and coaches.

Past programs

Alternative Narrative (Albada’alya) 

"100QV:'”' 100 Questions on Violence was the first campaign launched through Albada'alya (the alternative narrative); it was asking questions on violence and hate speech and providing contextual information to the readers."Speak and Cook:” Speak and Cook initiated discussions around topics related to online speech and resiliency. It was an outdoor activity during which participants cooked traditional fried tomato pan and Sajyeh while talking."idare_to_love_speech:”'' IDare and Al Rai Centre for Strategic Studies hosted a national conference attended by journalists and politicians to discuss the issue. Organizers and national leaders spoke about the political and educational causes of hate speech and their repercussions.

Articipate 
Articipate is a type of youth participation and self expression through art; theater, comics, fire theater, rap, music and art installations. Articipate is a method of expression established by artists in the 1900s. Articipate provides resources to create artistic projects aimed at self-expression in a non-formal environment. The idea is meant to find an intersection for young people, and find a balance between art and activism.

Tabir 
In 2018, IDare and Wapikoni Mobile Wapikoni (Canada) created the Tabir project (which translates to ‘Expression’). Young people created personal film projects, and the 6-month project culminated in seven short videos showing the culture of Ajloun.

Comicipate 
In 2018, IDare and the Spanish Cooperation in Jordan and the Spanish Embassy released a comic book created by young artists to comment on social phenomena. It featured themes of peace, tolerance and social cohesion through storytelling, and included stories of characters that emulated their artists’ families.

UNSCR-2250 
In 2017, IDare published a recommendation for a practical translation of the United Nations Security Council Resolution (UNSCR) 2250 in Jordan in Arabic and in English. The UN Deputy Secretary General, Amina Mohammed, also visited the IDare youth center in Amman.

References 

Non-profit organisations based in Jordan
Organizations established in 2013
Education in Jordan
Youth in Jordan